Jersey Community Unit School District 100 is a public K-12 school district based in Jerseyville, Illinois. The school district consists of five attendance centers in two municipalities, serving students in most of Jersey County, Illinois, and a small portion of southern Greene County, Illinois.

District information
Total enrollment for the district is approximately 3,000 students each school year. The current superintendent is Brad Tuttle.

The district is governed by a seven-member school board.

Current schools

Elementary schools
Grafton Elementary School - located in Grafton, serves Pre-Kindergarten through fifth grade, new building was opened in 2005
Jerseyville East Elementary School - located in Jerseyville, serves second through fourth grades, building was extensively renovated and reopened in 2012
Jerseyville West Elementary School - located in Jerseyville, serves Pre-Kindergarten through first grade

Middle schools
Jersey Community Middle School - located in Jerseyville, serves fifth through seventh grades, was formerly named Illini Middle School until May 2018

High schools
Jersey Community High School - located in Jerseyville, serves all students in eighth through twelfth grades, new building was opened in 2006

Former schools
Delhi Elementary School - located in Delhi, Illinois, served Pre-Kindergarten through fifth grade; closed in June 2012 due to district realignment.
Dow Elementary School - located in Dow, served Kindergarten through fifth grade; closed in June 2011 due to district realignment.
Fieldon Elementary School - located in Fieldon, served Kindergarten through fifth grade; closed in June 2012 due to district realignment.
Kane Elementary School - located in Kane, served Kindergarten through sixth grade; closed in 1982 due to rising costs of maintenance.

School districts in Illinois
Education in Jersey County, Illinois
Jerseyville, Illinois